The 1973 U.S. National Indoor Tennis Championships was a men's tennis tournament held at the Wicomico Youth and Civic Center in Salisbury, Maryland in the United States. The event was part of the 1973 USLTA Indoor Circuit. It was the third edition of the tournament and was held from February 19 through February 24, 1994, and played on indoor carpet courts. First-seeded Jimmy Connors won the singles title and $9,000 first-prize money.

Finals

Singles
 Jimmy Connors defeated  Karl Meiler 3–6, 7–6, 7–6, 6–3
 It was Connor's fourth singles title of the year, and the tenth of his career.

Doubles
 Jürgen Fassbender /  Juan Gisbert, Sr. defeated  Clark Graebner /  Ilie Năstase 2–6, 6–4, 6–3

References

External links
 ITF tournament edition details

Tennis tournaments in the United States
Salisbury, Maryland
U.S. National Indoor Tennis Championships
U.S. National Indoor Tennis Championships
U.S. National Indoor Tennis Championships